This is a list of seasons completed by the Arizona Cardinals. The Cardinals are an American football franchise competing as a member of the West division of the National Football Conference (NFC) in the National Football League (NFL). 

The Cardinals were founded in 1898 in Chicago as an amateur team, the Morgan Athletic Club. They became the Racine Street Normals shortly afterward. In 1901, owner Chris O'Brien acquired some used jerseys from the University of Chicago for the Normals. O'Brien believed that the jerseys had faded so much that they were more cardinal red than maroon, and changed the team's name to the Racine Cardinals. The team disbanded in 1906, but were refounded in 1913. The team did not play in 1918 due to World War I, but were refounded after the Armistice and have played continuously ever since. The team was a charter member of the American Professional Football Association, forerunner of the NFL, in 1920. To avoid confusion with a team from Racine, Wisconsin who joined the renamed NFL in 1922, the team changed its name to the Chicago Cardinals. The team moved to St. Louis, Missouri as the St. Louis Cardinals in 1960, then to their current home of Phoenix, Arizona in 1988. After playing as the Phoenix Cardinals from 1988 to 1993, the team took its current name in 1994. 

The Cardinals and Chicago Bears are the only two charter members of the NFL still playing in the league today. Through the heritage of the Morgan Athletic Club, the Cardinals also claim to be the oldest professional football team in the country.

The list documents the season-by-season records of the Cardinals' franchise from 1920 to present, including postseason records, and league awards for individual players or head coaches.

Legend

Season records

References

 
 

 
Arizona Cardinals
Seasons
Seasons